The 2017 Mid-Ohio Challenge was the 21st stock car race of the 2017 NASCAR Xfinity Series season and the fifth iteration of the event. The race was held on Saturday, August 12, 2018, in Lexington, Ohio at the Mid-Ohio Sports Car Course, a 2.258 miles (3.634 km) permanent road course. The race took the scheduled 75 laps to complete. At race's end, Sam Hornish Jr., driving for Team Penske, would hold off the field on the final restart with five to go to complete a dominant performance. The win was Hornish's sixth and to date, final career win in the NASCAR Xfinity Series and his only win of the season. To fill out the podium, Daniel Hemric, driving for Richard Childress Racing, and Matt Tifft, driving for Joe Gibbs Racing, would finish second and third, respectively.

Background 

The track is a road course auto racing facility located in Troy Township, Morrow County, Ohio, United States, just outside the village of Lexington. Mid-Ohio has also colloquially become a term for the entire north-central region of the state, from south of Sandusky to the north of Columbus.

The track opened as a 15-turn, 2.4 mile (3.86 km) road circuit run clockwise. The back portion of the track allows speeds approaching 180 mph (290 km/h). A separate starting line is located on the backstretch to allow for safer rolling starts. The regular start / finish line is located on the pit straight. There is grandstand seating for 10,000 spectators and three observation mounds alongside the track raise the capacity to over 75,000.

Entry list 

 (R) denotes rookie driver.
 (i) denotes driver who is ineligible for series driver points.

Practice 
Originally, two practices were scheduled to be held on Friday, August 11. However, rain would force the cancellation of both sessions. Instead, a lone practice session was run the following day.

The only 45-minute practice session was held on Saturday, August 12, at 8:00 AM EST.

Qualifying 
Qualifying was held on Saturday, August 12, at 12:00 PM EST. Since the Mid-Ohio Sports Car Course is a road course, the qualifying system was a multi-car system that included two rounds. The first round was 25 minutes, where every driver would be able to set a lap within the 25 minutes. Then, the second round would consist of the fastest 12 cars in Round 1, and drivers would have 10 minutes to set a lap. Whoever set the fastest time in Round 2 would win the pole.

No drivers would fail to qualify.

Full qualifying results

Race results 
Stage 1 Laps: 20 

Stage 2 Laps: 20 

Stage 3 Laps: 35

Standings after the race 

Drivers' Championship standings

Note: Only the first 12 positions are included for the driver standings.

References 

2017 NASCAR Xfinity Series
NASCAR races at Mid-Ohio Sports Car Course
August 2017 sports events in the United States
2017 in sports in Ohio